The Democratic Caucus of the United States Senate, sometimes referred to as the Democratic Conference, is the formal organization of all senators who are part of the Democratic Party in the United States Senate. For the makeup of the 118th Congress, the caucus additionally includes three independent senators (Bernie Sanders of Vermont, Angus King of Maine, and Kyrsten Sinema of Arizona) who caucus with the Democrats, bringing the current total to 51 members. The central organizational front for Democrats in the Senate, its primary function is communicating the party's message to all of its members under a single banner. The present chair of the Senate Democratic Caucus is Chuck Schumer of New York.

Current leadership 
Effective with the start of the 118th Congress, the conference leadership is as follows:
 Senate Majority Leader Chuck Schumer (New York) (Caucus Leader)
 Senate Majority Whip: Dick Durbin (Illinois)
 Policy Committee Chair: Debbie Stabenow (Michigan)
 Steering Committee Chair: Amy Klobuchar (Minnesota)
Caucus Vice Chairs: Mark Warner (Virginia) and Elizabeth Warren (Massachusetts)
 Outreach Committee Chair: Bernie Sanders (Vermont)
 Policy Committee Vice Chair: Joe Manchin (West Virginia) and Cory Booker (New Jersey)
 Caucus Secretary: Tammy Baldwin (Wisconsin)
 Caucus Deputy Secretary: Brian Schatz (Hawaii)
 Campaign Committee Chair: Gary Peters (Michigan)
 Outreach Committee Vice Chair: Catherine Cortez Masto (Nevada)
 Chief Deputy Whip: Jeff Merkley (Oregon)
 President pro tempore: Patty Murray (Washington)

History 
The conference was formally organized on March 6, 1903, electing a chair to preside over its members and a secretary to keep minutes.  Until that time, this caucus was often disorganized, philosophically divided and had neither firm written rules of governance nor a clear mission.

Chairs of the Senate Democratic Caucus
Since Oscar Underwood's election in 1920, the chair of the Senate Democratic Caucus has also concurrently served as the floor leader as part of an unwritten tradition.

Notes

Vice chair 
After the victory of Democrats in the midterm elections of 2006, an overwhelming majority in the conference wanted to reward Chuck Schumer, then the chair of the Democratic Senatorial Campaign Committee, with a position in the leadership hierarchy. In response, then-Democratic Leader Harry Reid created the position of vice-chair when Democrats formally took control in 2007. Schumer ascended to Reid's position following his retirement after the 2016 elections. The position was then split, with one co-chair awarded to Mark Warner and the other awarded to Elizabeth Warren.
 Chuck Schumer (2007–2017)
 Mark Warner and Elizabeth Warren (2017–present)

Caucus secretary
The United States Senate Democratic Conference Secretary, also called the Caucus Secretary was previously considered the number-three position, behind the party's floor leader and the party's whip, until in 2006, when Democratic leader Harry Reid created the new position of Vice-Chairman of the caucus. Now, the secretary is the fourth-highest ranking position. The conference secretary is responsible for taking notes and aiding the party leadership when senators of the party meet or caucus together.

The first conference secretary was Sen. Edward W. Carmack of Tennessee, who was elected in March 1903.

The current conference secretary is Sen. Tammy Baldwin of Wisconsin, who assumed the office in January 2017.

On December 8, 2022 Sen. Brian Schatz of Hawaii was elected to the newly created position of Deputy Caucus Secretary, assuming the office at the beginning of the 118th Congress on January 3, 2023. This is an elevation from his previous leadership role as Senate Democratic Chief Deputy Whip.

References

Bibliography 
 Donald A. Ritchie (ed) (1999). Minutes of the Senate Democratic Conference: Fifty-eighth through Eighty-eighth Congress, 1903-1964. Washington, D.C. GPO. Available online in PDF or text format.

External links 
 Official Home of the Senate Democratic Caucus on the Internet
 Senate Party Leadership – much of this article's content was adapted from this useful public domain resource
 First Formal Organization of the Senate Democratic Caucus

Caucus of the United States Senate
Democratic Caucus
United States Senate
Lists related to the United States Senate